Adolf Christian (3 June 1934 in Vienna – 8 July 1999 in Vienna) was an Austrian professional road bicycle racer. In 1957, Christian finished 3rd place in the general classification of the Tour de France, and he is the only Austrian to legitimately reach the podium. (In 2008 Bernhard Kohl also reached 3rd position but was later disqualified for doping.) In January 1958, he became Sportsman of the Year 1957.

His profession was a decorator in his own company.

Major results

1954
 national amateur road race champion
Vienna-Grabenstein-Gresten-Vienna
Vienna-Graz-Vienna
Tour of Austria
1955
GP Voralberg
1955
Vienna-Budapest-Vienna
Graz Rundfahrt
Vienna-Grabenstein-Gresten-Vienna
1957
Tour de France:
3rd place overall classification
1962
Tour de Hongrie

External links

References 

Official Tour de France results for Adolf Christian

Austrian male cyclists
1934 births
1999 deaths
Cyclists from Vienna